Chabinlu (also Romanized as Chabīnlū; also known as Chabānlū and Chapanlū) is a village in Sarajuy-ye Sharqi Rural District, Saraju District, Maragheh County, East Azerbaijan Province, Iran. At the 2006 census, its population was 224, in 50 families.

References 

Towns and villages in Maragheh County